Martin Joseph O'Toole (27 May 1925 – 1 October 2013) was an Irish Fianna Fáil politician. He was a Senator from 1977 to 1989, then a Teachta Dála (TD) from 1989 to 1992.

Born in Louisburgh, County Mayo, O'Toole was a farmer, livestock exporter and haulage contractor before entering politics. He was a member of Mayo County Council and served as chairman on a number of occasions. He was elected in 1977 to the 14th Seanad Éireann on the Agricultural Panel. O'Toole was returned to the Seanad four times until the 1989 general election when he was elected to Dáil Éireann as a TD for Mayo West. He stood down at the 1992 general election after serving only one term in the Dáil.

References

1925 births
2013 deaths
Fianna Fáil TDs
Members of the 14th Seanad
Members of the 15th Seanad
Members of the 16th Seanad
Members of the 17th Seanad
Members of the 18th Seanad
Members of the 26th Dáil
Politicians from County Mayo
Local councillors in County Mayo
Irish farmers
Fianna Fáil senators